is a Japanese football player.

Club statistics

References

External links

1988 births
Living people
Association football people from Osaka Prefecture
Japanese footballers
J1 League players
J2 League players
Tokyo Verdy players
Japanese expatriate footballers
Japanese expatriate sportspeople in Paraguay
Expatriate footballers in Paraguay
Expatriate footballers in Latvia
Expatriate footballers in Poland
Association football midfielders